HMS Mounts Bay was a  anti-aircraft frigate of the British Royal Navy, named after Mount's Bay in Cornwall. In commission from 1949 until 1960, she saw active service in the Korean War, and was sold to Portugal in 1961 to serve as NRP Vasco da Gama until 1971.

Construction
The ship was originally ordered from William Pickersgill & Sons Ltd. of South Bank, Middlesbrough, on 25 January 1943 as the  Loch Kilburnie. However, in late 1943 the contract was changed, and the ship was laid down on 23 October 1944 to a revised design as a Bay class. She was launched as Mounts Bay on 8 June 1945, but work on the ship was then suspended. Finally, on 20 March 1946, the ship was transferred to the shipyard of John I. Thornycroft & Company at Woolston, Southampton where she was completed on 11 April 1949.

Service history
Mounts Bay was commissioned for service, and after sea trials and training she sailed to the Far East to join the 4th Frigate Flotilla. From 1950 to 1953 she was part of the United Nations Task Force based at Sasebo, Japan, with other Commonwealth warships in support of military operations in Korean waters, spending routine maintenance and rest periods at Kure, Japan. She was also deployed for Squadron duties, including patrols to protect British merchant ships trading between ports in China and the South China Sea. When not deployed off Korea she carried out patrols off Malayan coast in support of British anti-insurgent operations, and took part in Squadron and Fleet exercises and visits to ports in the Far East. After the Korean War armistice was signed on 27 July 1953, the UN Task Force operations continued, and Mounts Bay was deployed as a guardship into 1954. In September of that year she returned to the UK to refit and then served in the West Indies in 1955, in the South Atlantic in 1957, and then returned to Far East.

Decommissioning and disposal
In May 1960 the ship was decommissioned and put into Reserve at Portsmouth. Placed on the Disposal List in 1961 she was sold to Portugal. She was modernized by John I Thornycroft in Southampton, before being commissioned by the Portuguese Navy on 3 August 1961.

References

Publications
 

 

1945 ships
Bay-class frigates
Frigates of the Portuguese Navy
Korean War frigates of the United Kingdom